Françoise Roch-Ramel (née Ramel; 20 September 1931 – 26 June 2001) was a Swiss pharmacologist and a leading expert on the renal transport of organic anions and cations, especially uric acid. 

A native of Château-d'Œx, her major research focus was the renal excretion of drugs and other xenobiotics. She was a professor at the Department of Pharmacology and Toxicology at the University of Lausanne, where she was employed in the early 1960s as an assistant of Professor Georges Peters.

References

1931 births
2001 deaths
Swiss pharmacologists
People from Château-d'Œx
Academic staff of the University of Lausanne